George McCord (August 1, 1848– April 6, 1909) was an American painter, known for atmospheric marine and landscape paintings in oil, pastel, and watercolor and for black and white drawings, George McCord was born in New York City and remained primarily a resident in Brooklyn although he traveled widely and from 1883 also had a studio in Morristown, New Jersey.  He was part of the second generation of Hudson River School painters.

He studied at the Hudson River Institute, the Claverack Academy in Claverack, New York.

References

19th-century American painters
19th-century American male artists
American male painters
Hudson River School painters
1848 births
1909 deaths